Pisidium hodgkini is a freshwater bivalve of the family Sphaeriidae, which is found in New Zealand.

References

Bivalves of New Zealand
hodgkini
Molluscs described in 1905